What's the Time in Your World? (Persian: در دنیای تو ساعت چند است؟ / Dar Donya-ye To Saát Chand Ast?) is a 2014 drama film by Safi Yazdanian, the main actors are Ali Mosaffa and Leila Hatami.

Plot 
After twenty years in Paris, Gilehgol "Goli" Ebtehaj returns to her hometown near Rasht, leaving her French beau, Antoine, behind. She is greeted by Farhad Yervan, the self-described "Mr. Idiot" painter who claims to know her since long ago. Goli is repulsed by his advances and the fact that he knows so many things about her, while she is distressed that everyone in the town seems to accuse her of missing out her mother, Hava's funeral five years ago. She later recollects that Farhad knew her since at least college times. Interspersed with her story are flashbacks showing that Farhad had made repeated contacts with Hava, from whom he learned about Goli. Hava held Farhad affectionately and lamented Goli's indifference towards him.

Goli begins reconnecting with her old life, including meeting with her college crush, Ali Yaghuti, who is now married with three children, her aunt who lives in Bandar-e Anzali, and tea plantation owner Mr. Najdi, who reveals that he had plans to propose to Hava before he moved overseas. At one point, Goli becomes furious at Farhad due to his repeated advances and lets him get attacked by a mob for harassment, though she later apologizes and invites him to her house. He does so by walking with his head on the streets and carrying a large suitcase; when he arrives, he collapses from dizziness. 

As Goli calls him, flashbacks reveal that Farhad had in fact known and fallen in love with Goli since they were children. He observed her mannerisms, her fondness, even her habit of drawing X every time she went to the pier, which is later explained as a way for her to remember a lost lyric for a song. After he wakes up, he shows Goli the contents of the suitcase: all things that she used to hold dear. The two stay together until night, when an exhausted Farhad decides to sleep on a table in the living room, with Goli bidding him good night.

Cast 
 Leila Hatami as Goli Ebtehaj
 Ali Mosaffa as Farhad Yervani
 Zari Khoshkam as Hava Mostufi
 Ebrahim Zamir as Mr. Najdi
 Zeynab Shabani as Arash
 Christophe Rezai as Antoine / Monsieur Legrand
 Payam Yazdani as Ali Yaghuti
 Lili Samii as Khaljan

Awards
 Winner FIPRESCI Award 19th Busan International Film Festival
 Winner GOLD FIFOG for Best Film 10th International Oriental Film Festival of Geneva
 Winner Audience Award 5th Iranian Film Festival, Brisbane, Sydney, Canberra, Adelaide, Melbourne, Australia
 Winner Crystal Simorgh for Best Screenplay Fajr International Film Festival

References

External links 
 
 In International Federation of Film Critics
 Official Trailer
 Official Portal - WHAT’S THE TIME IN YOUR WORLD?
 In IFFA Festival
 In Vilnius International Film Festival
 In National Food Security Act
 In King's College London

2014 drama films
2014 films
Iranian drama films